Clarksville is a ghost town in Defiance County, in the U.S. state of Ohio.

History
Clarksville was platted in 1836, and named for Elisha Clark, proprietor.

References

Geography of Defiance County, Ohio